Xue Yanzhong (born February 1954) is a People's Republic of China politician. He was born in Xiaoyi, Shanxi. He was an alternate members of the 17th Central Committee of the Chinese Communist Party.

In April 2008 he was named deputy party chief of Shanxi. In January 2009, he became the chairman of the Shanxi People's Political Consultative Conference.

References

1954 births
People's Republic of China politicians from Shanxi
Chinese Communist Party politicians from Shanxi
Alternate members of the 17th Central Committee of the Chinese Communist Party
Vice-governors of Shanxi
Deputy Communist Party secretaries of Shanxi
CPPCC Committee Chairmen of Shanxi
Living people
Politicians from Lüliang